Willi Liebherr (born in 1947) is a German-Swiss entrepreneur chairman of the board of Liebherr Group.

Life and education
Willi Liebherr grew up in Upper Swabia's, Kirchdorf an der Iller and in Biberach. He graduated as an engineer from the Swiss Federal Institute of Technology in Zurich and lives in Nussbaumen, Switzerland.

Career 
In 1971, he joined the family business, Liebherr Group. Since the death of Hans Liebherr in 1993, he leads the construction machinery manufacturer together with his sister Isolde. Since 1999, he is the chairman of the board of Liebherr-International AG in Bulle.

Honors 
 Honorary doctorate from the University of Freiburg, 2006
 Chevalier of the Legion of Honour, 2010

Wealth 
On the Bloomberg Billionaires Index, the net worth of Willi Liebherr was stated to be approximately US$9.43 billion, placing him one of the richest person in Switzerland and Germany and 263rd on the list of the richest people in the world.
On the 2018 Forbes list, he ranked 222nd, with approximately US$7.1 billion.

References

External links 
 Official Liebherr website

Swiss industrialists
Swiss businesspeople
Chevaliers of the Légion d'honneur
German emigrants to Switzerland
1947 births
Academic staff of the University of Fribourg
Swiss billionaires
ETH Zurich alumni
Living people